Atlantic Coast Line Railroad Depot is a historic train station located at Conway in Horry County, South Carolina. It was built in 1928 by the Atlantic Coast Line Railroad, and is a long, rectangular, one-story, gable-roofed, frame board-and-batten building.  It features the wide overhanging eaves and is in the American Craftsman style.

It was listed on the National Register of Historic Places in 1995.

References

Railway stations on the National Register of Historic Places in South Carolina
Railway stations in the United States opened in 1928
Buildings and structures in Conway, South Carolina
Conway
National Register of Historic Places in Horry County, South Carolina
American Craftsman architecture in South Carolina
Arts and Crafts architecture in the United States
Railway depots on the National Register of Historic Places
Former railway stations in South Carolina
1928 establishments in South Carolina